Isa Khan Safavi, also known as Isa Khan Shaykhavand was a Safavid prince, who occupied high offices under king (shah) Abbas I (r. 1588–1629).

Biography 
Isa Khan was the grandson of the Safavid vizier Masum Beg Safavi, and was married to one of Abbas' daughters. In 1612, he was appointed by Abbas I as the head of the royal bodyguard (qurchi-bashi). In 1625, Isa Khan was appointed as the commander of the Safavid army of Georgia and fought a group of Georgian rebels on June 30. During the battle, he was almost defeated by the rebels, until reinforcements arrived from Azerbaijan and helped Isa Khan defeat the rebels.

In 1629, Abbas I died and was succeeded by his grandson Safi, who in 1631 executed Isa Khan including his three sons. Isa Khan's successor in the qurchi-bashi post was Cheragh Khan Zahedi.

During the reign of Safi's son and successor Abbas II (r. 1642–1666), a mausoleum was constructed for the three sons of Isa Khan.

References

Sources 

 
 
 
 
 

Safavid princes
Safavid generals
17th-century Iranian politicians
Year of birth unknown
1631 deaths
People executed by Safavid Iran
Qurchi-bashi
17th-century people of Safavid Iran